Romy Kermer (later Oesterreich; born 28 July 1956) is a German figure skating coach and former competitive pair skater. With Rolf Oesterreich, she is the 1976 Olympic silver medalist.

Personal life 
Romy Kermer was born on 28 July 1956 in Karl-Marx-Stadt (Chemnitz), Bezirk Karl-Marx-Stadt, East Germany. After marrying Rolf Oesterreich in late 1976, she changed her name to Romy Oesterreich.

Career 
Romy Kermer began skating in Karl-Marx-Stadt, where she became a pair skater. Early in her career, she competed with Tassilo Thierbach and Andreas Forner.

1972 she moved to Berlin and skated there at the club SC Dynamo Berlin. Her coach was Heidemarie Seiner-Walther. She continued to represent SC Karl-Marx-Stadt until 1973, when she changed clubs as well. Her pair skating partner became Rolf Oesterreich. Kermer/Oesterreich won the silver medal at the Winter Olympics 1976 in Innsbruck. In March 1976, they were both awarded the Patriotic Order of Merit for their Olympic success.

Romy Oesterreich became a figure skating coach at the club SC Berlin. One of her students, Philipp Tischendorf, won the bronze medal at the Junior Grand Prix 2005 in Bratislava.

Results

With Rolf Oesterreich

With Andreas Forner

References 

  SC Berlin e.V.
  Deutsche Eislauf-Union e.V.

External links

1956 births
Living people
Sportspeople from Chemnitz
German female pair skaters
Figure skaters at the 1976 Winter Olympics
Olympic figure skaters of East Germany
Olympic silver medalists for East Germany
German figure skating coaches
Olympic medalists in figure skating
World Figure Skating Championships medalists
European Figure Skating Championships medalists
Female sports coaches
Medalists at the 1976 Winter Olympics
Recipients of the Patriotic Order of Merit in bronze